Martin F. Jue is an American business personality, inventor and founder/owner of several companies, including MFJ Enterprises, Hy-Gain, Cushcraft, Ameritron, Vectronics and others, all of which manufacture products for the amateur radio industry. He holds numerous patents on specialized technology, especially in the area of T network field tuners.

Early life 

Martin F. Jue was born in Vicksburg to a Chinese American family and whose own great-grandfather helped build the transcontinental railroad across America in the late 1860s. He grew up in the small Mississippi delta town of Hollandale, Mississippi.

Career
Jue is a 1966 graduate of Mississippi State University's Bagley College of Engineering, which in 2014 honored him as a Distinguished Fellow. After graduating from MSU in 1966 and GIT in 1971, Jue worked for a year at Magnavox. In October, 1972, Jue began manufacturing a CW filter kit in a room of the now-defunct Stark Hotel in Starkville, Mississippi. Over the next forty years, MFJ would grow to become the largest manufacturer of amateur radio products in the world, and would garner numerous honors.

In 2012, the  American Radio Relay League (ARRL) awarded Jue the ARRL Special Achievement Award, honoring him for innovation in the field of amateur radio. Jue also serves on the board of On2Locate and Magnolia Intertie Inc.

Jue lives in Starkville with his wife Betty Quong Jue, where he is a member of the Starkville Rotary Club, board president of the Boys and Girls Clubs of the Golden Triangle, and board member of the Mississippi Children’s Museum. He has been inducted into the CQ Hall of Fame (2001) and the QRP (2009) Hall of Fame. In 2011, he was awarded the Ham Radio Outlet Certificate Of Honor. He is a member of the Alabama Historical Radio Society in Birmingham, Alabama.

References

External links
 MFJ Enterprises website

American chief executives
20th-century American inventors
Mississippi State University alumni
People from Starkville, Mississippi
Amateur radio people
Living people
Year of birth missing (living people)
American people of Chinese descent
Inventors from Mississippi